The Lad's Car was an American cyclecar automobile built between 1912 and 1914.

History 
The Niagara Motor Car Corporation of Niagara Falls, New York, built A 4hp air-cooled, single-seater juvenile car with belt drive. Marketed as Lad's Car, it was advertised as "providing mechanically minded children a 'sure-enough' motor vehicle, with a 'sure-enough' engine".

The car was priced at $170, . The 72-inch wheelbase cyclecar had a choice of hood and a kit version was available.

References

Defunct motor vehicle manufacturers of the United States
Kit car manufacturers
Cars introduced in 1912

Cyclecars
Brass Era vehicles
1910s cars
Motor vehicle manufacturers based in New York (state)